is a former Japanese football player.

Playing career
Kitamura was born in Shizuoka Prefecture on August 4, 1968. After graduating from Shizuoka Gakuen High School, he played for Honda and Gamba Osaka. He played often as a defender and a midfielder at Gamba in 1994 and 1995. However he did not play as much in 1996 and retired at the end of the 1996 season.

Futsal career
In 1989, Kitamura selected Japan national futsal team for 1989 Futsal World Championship in Netherlands.

Club statistics

References

External links

1968 births
Living people
Association football people from Shizuoka Prefecture
Japanese footballers
Japanese men's futsal players
Japan Soccer League players
J1 League players
Honda FC players
Gamba Osaka players
Association football defenders